LGBT people in Hungary face legal and social challenges not experienced by non-LGBT residents. Homosexuality is legal in Hungary for both men and women. Discrimination on the basis of sexual orientation and sex is banned in the country. However, households headed by same-sex couples are not eligible for all of the same legal rights available to heterosexual married couples. Registered partnership for same-sex couples was legalised in 2009, but same-sex marriage remains banned. The Hungarian government has passed legislation that restricts the civil rights of LGBT Hungarians – such as ending legal recognition of transgender Hungarians and banning LGBT content and displays for minors. This trend continues under the Fidesz government of Viktor Orbán. In June 2021, Hungary passed an anti-LGBT law on banning "homosexual and transexual propaganda" effective since July 1. The law has been condemned by seventeen EU countries so far. Also, in July 2021, the EU Commission has started legal action against Hungary and Poland for violations of fundamental rights of LGBTQI people: "Europe will never allow parts of our society to be stigmatized." Russia had similar laws implemented in 2013.

Law regarding same-sex sexual activity
The first Hungarian Penal Code by Károly Csemegi (1878) punished homosexuality between men ("természet elleni fajtalanság" – perversion against nature (nature's law)) with prison up to one year. Homosexual activity above the age of 20 was decriminalized in 1961, then above the age of 18 in 1978 by the new Penal Code. The age of consent, which is 14, has applied equally to heterosexual and homosexual activity since a Constitutional Court decision of 2002. Gay and bisexual people are not banned from military service.

Recognition of same-sex relationships

Unregistered cohabitation has been recognised since 1996. It applies to any couple living together in an economic and sexual relationship (common-law marriage), including same-sex couples. No official registration is required. The law gives some specified rights and benefits to two persons living together. Unregistered cohabitation is defined in the Civil Code as "when two persons are living together outside of wedlock in an emotional and financial community in the same household, provided that neither of them is engaged in wedlock or partnership with another person, registered or otherwise, and that they are not related in direct line, and they are not siblings." Inheritance is possible only with testament, and widow-pension is available for couples cohabiting for more than 10 years.

On 17 December 2007, the Parliament adopted a registered partnership bill submitted by the Hungarian Socialist Party–Alliance of Free Democrats Government. The bill was found unconstitutional by the Constitutional Court because it duplicated the institution of marriage for opposite-sex couples. In February 2009, the Parliament approval a modified version of the bill. Since 1 July 2009, same-sex couples can enter into registered partnerships. The law gives the same rights to registered partners as to spouses except for adoption, assisted reproduction or taking a surname.

On 1 January 2012, a new constitution, enacted by the Parliament in 2011, came into effect, restricting marriage to opposite-sex couples and containing no guarantees of protection from discrimination on account of sexual orientation. However, discrimination on the basis of sexual orientation remains banned through interpretation of the general non-discrimination provision in the Constitution, as well as by the Equal Treatment Act.

Adoption and family planning
Although same-sex couples cannot adopt jointly, adoption by individuals is illegal regardless of sexual orientation or partnership status. Stepchild adoption is only available for married (different-sex) couples.

Access to IVF and donor insemination is available for single women regardless of sexual orientation, but not available for lesbians cohabiting or in a registered partnership with their same-sex partners.

In November 2017, the Hungarian Ombudsman found that the rejection of a lesbian couple's adoption application was "an infringement on the child's right to protection and care, and amounted to unlawful discrimination based on sexual orientation." As joint adoption for same-sex couples is not legal in Hungary, the couple decided that one of the partners would legally adopt the child. The couple was, however, very open about their relationship and were found suitable to adopt. During the following months, the couple took care of a 16-month-old girl, but child protection services later stopped the application procedure due to the couple's sexual orientation. This decision disrupted the life of the child, as she would not eat properly anymore and had to be taken to a child psychologist. The couple appealed to the Commissioner for Fundamental Rights (the Ombudsman responsible for the rights of children, nationalities in Hungary, vulnerable social groups and the interests of future generations), who found the child protection service's rejection of the couple unlawful and discriminatory. The Commissioner said that "a person wishing to adopt has no right to adopt a particular child, but s/he does have the right to equal treatment and equality before the law in the procedure." The Commissioner based their decision on the 2008 E.B. v. France case, in which the European Court of Human Rights ruled that one's sexual orientation should not be a factor in adoption cases.

In October 2020, while discussing a children's book published by an LGBT organisation on Magyar Rádió, the Hungarian Prime Minister Viktor Orban stated that, despite Hungary being "tolerant and patient" towards LGBT people, "there is a red line that cannot be crossed" and that "gays are to leave our children alone".

In November 2020, the Fidesz government proposed a Constitutional amendment which would ban adoption by same-sex couples. Language in the amendment would ensure "education in accordance with the values based on Hungary's constitutional identity and Christian culture." The same amendment would also severely restrict the ability of single-parent families to adopt. On 16 December 2020 the amendment was passed by the National Assembly with 123 ayes, 45 nays and 5 abstentions.

Discrimination protections
In 2000, the Constitutional Court recognized that the constitutional ban on discrimination based on "other status" covers sexual orientation as well. The Act on Public Health has banned sexual orientation-related discrimination in health services since 1997 and gender identity-related discrimination since 2004. The 2003 Act on Equal Treatment and the Promotion of Equal Opportunities, which took effect in January 2004, forbids discrimination based on factors that include sexual orientation and gender identity in the fields of employment, education, housing, health, and access to goods and services. Article 8 of the Act states as follows:

Additionally, Hungarian law prohibits hate crimes and hate speeches on the basis of one's sexual orientation and gender identity.

In March 2023, Hungary is being taken to court via litigation processes due to ongoing state-sanctioned discrimination against LGBT individuals within it's borders - that goes against EU directives and protocols.

Gender identity and expression
In December 2017, a government decree was published, establishing for the first time a legal basis for gender transitions. After 1 January 2018, transgender people living in Hungary were theoretically able to change their legal gender. They required a diagnosis from a medical professional, but did not have to undergo hormone therapy, sterilization or sex reassignment surgery. The Equal Treatment Act specifically included "sexual identity" among the list of protected characteristics.

However, Transvanilla – an organization based in Budapest which campaigns on behalf of transgender rights – reports that the government has refused to honor applications of the legal gender change since 2018. In 2019, a joint case of 23 people was created and submitted to the European Court of Human Rights.

In 2018, Hungary enacted a ban on gender studies programs at universities.

Following the coronavirus lockdown of 2020, Viktor Orbán was enabled to rule by decree following an emergency powers act. On 31 March, the Transgender Day of Visibility, a bill was submitted that replaced the Hungarian term "nem", meaning "sex," with sex at birth, defined as "the biological sex determined by primary sexual characteristics and chromosomes". Parliament voted in favor of the bill on 19 May 2020, making it impossible for individuals to change their legal gender. The vote was 134 yes, 56 no, and 4 abstentions. Dunja Mijatović, commissioner for human rights in the Council of Europe, stated it "contravenes human rights standards and the case law of the European Court of Human Rights". President János Áder signed the bill into law on 28 May 2020.

In January 2021 the government ordered that a book published by the Labrisz Lesbian Association carries warnings saying it "[contains] behaviour inconsistent with traditional gender roles". According to a government spokesperson, "the book is sold as a fairytale... but it hides the fact that it depicts behaviour inconsistent with traditional gender roles." In response, the association announced that they would be filing suit.

Blood donation

Gay and bisexual men were allowed to donate blood following a 12-month deferral period. In 2020, this deferral period was scrapped, with individualised risk assessment introduced.

Freedom of speech and expression
In 2012, Jobbik MP Ádám Mirkóczki introduced a constitutional amendment to the Parliament seeking to ban "the promotion of sexual deviations". The amendment would punish the "promotion of homosexuality or other disorders of sexual behaviour" with up to eight years in prison. LMBT Federation, a Hungarian LGBT advocacy group, protested against the amendment and called on Parliament to reject it. The Democratic Coalition also voiced their opposition and called it "mean and shameful". The amendment ultimately failed to pass.

In November 2016, the small Hungarian town of Ásotthalom passed a law banning "gay propaganda", Muslim call to prayer and Muslim clothing. Mayor László Toroczkai (Our Homeland) called on Christians locals to support a "holy war on Muslims and multiculturalism". In April 2017, after a lawsuit challenging the ban was filed, the Constitutional Court struck down the ban, ruling that it violated human rights law as it aimed to "limit directly the freedom of speech, conscience and religion".

In June 2018, the Hungarian State Opera House cancelled 15 Billy Elliot performances, after pro-government newspaper Magyar Idők claimed that the show could turn children gay. However other 29 Billy Elliot performances would be held as planned.

In November 2020, the town of Nagykáta adopted a resolution banning the dissemination and promotion of so-called "LGBT propaganda".

After making pro-LGBT statements, former footballer and television pundit János Hrutka was fired by pro-government sports television Spíler TV in March 2021. Subsequently, the government media (Nemzeti Sport and FourFourTwo) began to revive his player contracts from the past twenty years, with the intention of expiration.

2021 promotion of homosexuality law

In June 2021, the government of Hungary introduced a law prohibiting the showing of "any content portraying or promoting sex reassignment or homosexuality" to minors. A Hungarian government spokesperson claimed the ban is intended on the contents which children "can misunderstand and which may have a detrimental effect on their development". According to one human rights group, "the new legislation proposed by Fidesz would seriously curb freedom of speech and children's rights... This move endangers [the] mental health of LGBTQI youngsters and prevents them getting access to information... and affirmative support". David Vig of Amnesty International stated that "these proposals, which have dark echoes of Russia's anti-gay 'propaganda law,' will further stigmatize LGBTI people, exposing them to greater discrimination in what is already a hostile environment."

The Hungarian parliament voted in favour of the bill by a vote of 157–1. The President of Hungary signed the bill into law on 23 June 2021 and went into legal effect 7 days later on July 1. The Russian Federation also has a similar law (Russian gay propaganda law) implemented since 2013. Seventeen EU member states (Belgium, the Netherlands, Luxembourg, Denmark, Estonia, Finland, France, Germany, Ireland, Lithuania, Spain, Sweden, Latvia, Greece, Cyprus, Italy and Austria) and several LGBT and human rights organisations condemned the law and called it a breach of the Charter of Fundamental Rights of the European Union. The Prime Minister of the Netherlands suggested Hungary leave the EU altogether, while Poland has expressed support for the law 

In July 2021, the EU launched an immediate lawsuit against the anti-LGBT propaganda law recently implemented within Hungary while a referendum has been announced. The European Commission blocked the payment of several billions Euro to Hungary because of this discriminatory law. The referendum took place on 3 April 2022, the same time as the 2022 Hungarian parliamentary election. The referendum became invalid, because it didn't meet the validity threshold of 50%.

Films and TV
In September 2021, it was reported that films and TV shows that depict and show either homosexuality and/or sex changes within Hungary - would have the same mandatory legal classification "age rating restrictions" as horror, nudity, sex, adult themes, drugs and/or violence.

Living conditions

Hungary was the host country of Mr Gay Europe 2007 contest and the EuroGames in 2012.

Budapest Pride was the first such event in the former Eastern Bloc, and draws a steady, but a moderate number of LGBT people and their supporters. The LGBT festival lasts a week every summer with a film festival, a pride march and parties across the city. The festival was opened in the past by notable public figures including Gábor Demszky, then Mayor of Budapest, and Kinga Göncz, then Minister of Foreign Affairs.

In correlation with the prime ministership of Viktor Orbán, LGBT rights in Hungary have stalled. In March 2016, the Hungarian Government blocked a proposed European Union agreement to combat discrimination against LGBT people. In May 2017, Prime Minister Orbán welcomed the World Congress of Families, a designated hate group by the Southern Poverty Law Center, at the National Parliament. In 2018, Hungary and Poland blocked a joint statement by EU employment and social affairs ministers intended to promote gender equity in the digital era because of objections to a reference to LGBT people. However, Austria—then president of the Council of the European Union—adopted the text regardless, though with modifications. While the reference to LGBT people was retained, the text was classified as "presidential conclusions" which do not carry the legal weight of formal Council conclusions.

In recent years, more and more politicians have resorted to use openly homophobic rhetoric. In 2014, Jobbik displayed a sign reading "The Parliament Does Not Want Any Deviants" during Budapest Pride, and verbally abused attendees and defaced posters in support of LGBT rights. In November 2016, it protested the painting of a fence with rainbow colours in Pomáz, even though the colouring had no connections to LGBT rights.

The 2017 Budapest Pride parade attracted thousands of people, and received the support of many embassies, including from Australia, Canada, France, Germany, the United Kingdom and the United States, as well as neighbouring Slovakia and Slovenia, among others.

In January 2018, the European Court of Justice ruled that asylum seekers may not be subjected by authorities to psychological tests in order to determine their sexual orientation.

Public opinion
Polls reflecting popular opinion on same-sex marriage in Hungary have shown a mixed picture.

According to a Eurobarometer survey published in December 2006, only 18 percent of Hungarians surveyed supported same-sex marriage, and only 13 percent recognized a same-sex couple's right to adopt, compared to the EU-wide average of 44 percent and 33 percent, respectively. However, a poll conducted a year after in 2007 indicated that 30 percent of the Hungarian public supported same-sex marriage.

The Eurobarometer poll taken in 2015 suggested 39% of Hungarians supported same-sex marriage. A more recent poll by the Pew Research Center, published in May 2017, suggested that 27% of Hungarians were in favor of same-sex marriage, while 64% opposed it. Support was higher among non-religious people (34%) and 18–34 year olds (39%), in contrast to Catholics (25%) and people aged 35 and over (23%).

In May 2015, PlanetRomeo, an LGBT social network, published its first Gay Happiness Index (GHI). Gay men from over 120 countries were asked about how they feel about society's view on homosexuality, how they experience the way they are treated by other people and how satisfied are they with their lives. Hungary was ranked 49th with a GHI score of 47.

According to a 2017 poll carried out by ILGA, 64% of Hungarians agreed that gay, lesbian and bisexual people should enjoy the same rights as straight people, while 15% disagreed. Additionally, 69% agreed that they should be protected from workplace discrimination. 13% of Hungarians, however, said that people who are in same-sex relationships should be charged as criminals, while 64% disagreed. As for transgender people, 60% agreed that they should have the same rights, 64% believed they should be protected from employment discrimination and a plurality of 48% believed they should be allowed to change their legal gender.

Summary table

See also

 "Mások" ("Others", monthly Hungarian LGBT magazine)
 List of gay-rights organizations#Hungary
 LGBT history in Hungary
 LGBT rights in Europe
 LGBT rights in the European Union

References

External links

 Social visibility and acceptance of LGBT people in Hungary. policy.hu
 Budapest GayGuide.Net
 Rainbow Europe: Hungary. ILGA-Europe

Discrimination against transgender people